Webster County is a county in the U.S. state of Iowa. As of the 2020 census, the population was 36,999. The county seat is Fort Dodge. The county was established in January 1851, one of 43 counties established by a legislative package. This county was named after Daniel Webster, an American statesman noted for his moving oratory.

Webster County comprises the Fort Dodge, IA Micropolitan Statistical Area.

Geography

Major highways
 U.S. Highway 20 – runs east–west across central Webster County, through Moorland and Coalville.
 U.S. Highway 169 – enters northern Webster County at mid-county and runs south to Harcourt. It runs four miles east, then turns south to exit the county.
 Iowa Highway 7 – enters western Webster County running east from Manson. It runs east to its terminus at US Highway 169 at Fort Dodge.
 Iowa Highway 175 – enters southeastern Webster County, running west from Stratford. It runs west and south–north to its connection to US Highway 169, four miles east of Harcourt.
 Iowa Highway 144 – enters southern Webster County near its midpoint. It runs north to its connection to Iowa Highway 175, three miles west of Harcourt.

Transit
 List of intercity bus stops in Iowa

Airport
The Fort Dodge Regional Airport (FOD) is located just north of Fort Dodge. It is primarily a general aviation airport. Daily direct flights are operated to Lambert-St. Louis International Airport and Minneapolis-Saint Paul International Airport, with connecting service through Mason City to Chicago O'Hare International Airport.

Adjacent counties
Boone County (southeast)
Calhoun County (west)
Greene County (southwest)
Hamilton County (east)
Humboldt County (north)
Pocahontas County (northwest)
Wright County (northeast)

Demographics

2020 census
There were 16,937 housing units, of which 15,046 were occupied.

2010 census
There were 17,035 housing units, of which 15,580 were occupied.

2000 census

As of the census of 2000, there were 40,235 people, 15,878 households, and 10,304 families in the county. The population density was 56 people per square mile (22/km2). There were 16,969 housing units at an average density of 24 per square mile (9/km2). The racial makeup of the county was 93.39% White, 3.39% Black or African American, 0.30% Native American, 0.66% Asian, 0.02% Pacific Islander, 1.10% from other races, and 1.15% from two or more races. 2.35% of the population were Hispanic or Latino of any race.

Of the 15,878 households 30.20% had children under the age of 18 living with them, 51.80% were married couples living together, 9.50% had a female householder with no husband present, and 35.10% were non-families. 30.30% of households were one person and 13.10% were one person aged 65 or older. The average household size was 2.38 and the average family size was 2.97.

The age distribution was 24.50% under the age of 18, 11.10% from 18 to 24, 25.50% from 25 to 44, 21.60% from 45 to 64, and 17.40% 65 or older. The median age was 38 years. For every 100 females there were 100.30 males. For every 100 females age 18 and over, there were 98.20 males.

The median household income was $35,334 and the median family income  was $43,772. Males had a median income of $31,047 versus $23,042 for females. The per capita income for the county was $17,857. About 6.70% of families and 10.00% of the population were below the poverty line, including 12.30% of those under age 18 and 7.00% of those age 65 or over.

Population ranking
The population ranking of the following table is based on the 2020 census of Webster County.

† county seat

Communities

Cities

Badger
Barnum
Callender
Clare
Dayton
Duncombe
Fort Dodge
Gowrie
Harcourt
Lehigh
Moorland
Otho
Stratford (in Webster and Hamilton Counties)
Vincent

Census-designated place
Coalville

Unincorporated communities

Burnside
Lanyon

Townships
Townships include:

Badger
Burnside
Clay
Colfax
Cooper
Dayton
Deer Creek
Douglas
Elkhorn
Fulton 
Gowrie
Hardin
Jackson
Johnson
Lost Grove
Newark
Otho
Pleasant Valley
Roland
Sumner
Wahkonsa
Washington
Webster
Yell

Notable people
Robert Schliske, member of the Wyoming House of Representatives, 1971–1975, born in Webster County

Politics
In every U.S. presidential election from 1984 to 2012, the Democratic candidate has won a majority in Webster County, but in 2016 the county voted for Republican Donald Trump by a wide margin, a nearly 27 point swing from 2012.  In 2020, Trump received a larger percentage of the county's vote (over 61%) than any presidential candidate since Lyndon Johnson in 1964.

See also

Webster County Courthouse
National Register of Historic Places listings in Webster County, Iowa

Notes

References

External links

Webster County government's website
Webster County map 1895
Webster County Fair Website 

 
1851 establishments in Iowa
Populated places established in 1851